Bentwisch is a municipality in the Rostock district, in Mecklenburg-Vorpommern, Germany, to the east of Rostock. Since its merger with Klein Kussewitz in January 2018, the municipality has 3,174 inhabitants and covers 29.19 square kilometres. Due to its proximity to Rostock, the B 105, and the A 19, Bentwisch became a place of industry after German reunification.

Bentwisch has a substation for 220 kV/110kV and the static inverter plant of the HVDC Kontek. Both facilities are a few kilometres away from each other. In 2002 the static inverter plant Bentwisch was enlarged by a substion for 380 kV/110kV and between the static invertor plant and the 220 kV/110 kV-substation, which was built in difference to the static invertor plant at times, East Germany existed, a 110 kV powerline for 3 phase AC was built.

People
 Emanuel Hirsch

References